His Majesty's Government of Gibraltar is the democratically elected government of the British Overseas Territory of Gibraltar. The head of state is King Charles III who is represented by the Governor. Elections in Gibraltar are held every four years, with a unicameral parliament of 18 members of which 17 members are elected by popular vote and one, the Speaker, appointed by Parliament.

The executive
The leader of the majority party (or majority coalition) is formally appointed by the governor as the Chief Minister (head of government).

The legislature
The Cabinet (Council of Ministers) is generally formed by 10 of the 17 elected Members of Parliament, through choice made by the Chief Minister with the approval of the Governor. The seven remaining members constitute the Opposition (Shadow Cabinet).

The last general election was held on 17 October 2019.

Cabinet
The Cabinet (elected as from December 2011) and after the reshuffle, as announced by the Chief Minister after the 2019 general election.

See also 
 Gibraltar Parliament
 His Majesty's Most Loyal Opposition (Gibraltar)
 Judiciary of Gibraltar
 Politics of Gibraltar
 Political development in modern Gibraltar

References

External links 
 Official website